"Yokel Hero" is the 14th episode of the thirty-second season of the American animated television series The Simpsons, and the 698th episode overall. It aired in the United States on Fox on March 7, 2021. The episode was directed by Rob Oliver, and written by Jeff Martin & Samantha Martin.

Albert Brooks guest-stars as Slick manager. The episode featured "Yokel Hero" Cletus, received generally positive reviews, and was watched live in the United States by 1.38 million viewers.

Plot

On Carl's birthday, Homer misses family dinner, greatly disturbing his wife Marge. Homer gets drunk and ends up in the police jail. Marge then bans him from the house for the night to stop his foolish and drunk misconduct. Homer, in a cell, feels saddened and believes he screwed up, but Cletus cheers him up with a nice song on acoustic guitar. Realizing the error of his ways, Homer returns home to Bart, Lisa, Maggie and Marge to tell them that he is sorry and vows to be a better father and husband.

Realizing that Cletus could become a famous singer, Homer becomes Cletus' manager. Cletus becomes so successful that he gets an appearance on Elin Degenerous' (a parody of Ellen DeGeneres) show. Cletus also gets his own drink and, eventually, fires Homer as he is now a great singer. But after seeing how miserable his wife Brandine and their children are because he could not spend time with them, Cletus quits his career for his family.

Production

Casting
A. Brooks makes his 9th guest-star appearance in this episode as a Slick manager. Brooks previously portrayed Russ Cargill in The Simpsons Movie and guest-starred in seven previous episodes: "The Call of the Simpsons", "Life on the Fast Lane", "Bart's Inner Child", "The Heartbroke Kid", "500 Keys" and "Bull-E", and voiced Hank Scorpio in "You Only Move Twice" (credited as A. Brooks).

Development
In 2021, Fox released eight promotional pictures from the episode.

Reception

Viewing figures
In the United States, the episode was watched live by 1.38 million viewers.

Critical response
Tony Sokol with Den of Geek, said "The Simpsons delivers an extremely nuanced take on several well-worn themes. We know “Yokel Hero' will come to a predetermined end, because Cletus is a series regular and forever stuck in his local role." He also gave the episode 4 out of 5 stars.

References

External links

2021 American television episodes
The Simpsons (season 32) episodes